Kalimeris indica, also known as Indian aster or Indian Kalimeris, is a flowering herbaceous perennial plant of the family Asteraceae (Compositae). Kalimeris indica, like other species in the genus of Kalimeris, occurs mainly in eastern Asian countries of China, Korea and Japan, and has been introduced to California and Hawaii.

Description

Kalimeris indica commonly occurs on abandoned farm land, slopes of hills and ridges between rice fields. It is also often found along roads and trails in hardwood forests. It can reproduce sexually through production of seeds and asexually through stolons. Seeds germinate in early spring. Newly emerged seedlings are small with each cotyledon being approximately 2 mm in length.

Indian aster can grow to a height of 30–70 cm. Leaves are alternate and stems are typically upright. Blooming starts in late spring and will continue into October depending on the location and growth conditions for the plant, particularly nutrient level in the soil. Disk florets are light yellow and ray florets are either light purple or white. Fruits of Indian aster are small and dark.

Uses

Indian aster has wide culinary uses in East Asia. Young leaves and stems are collected in early spring time and cooked with other food items such as dried tofu (bean curd). It is considered a delicacy because of its special flavor. It is particularly popular south of Yangtze River in China where it is called 马兰头 malantou.

References

Asian vegetables
Leaf vegetables
Astereae